Claire Pettibone (born May 23, 1967) is an American fashion designer based in Los Angeles. She is known for her couture wedding gowns and intimate apparel, lifestyle collection.

Life and career
Pettibone was born on May 23, 1967 in Los Angeles, California, United States. Pettibone, the self-described “true romantic”, has emerged as the designer for which romance takes on a vintage yet modern je ne sais quoi. Pettibone formed a partnership with her husband, Guy Toley in 1993 when they started the brand "body & soul". Their debut lingerie collection was carried in Nordstrom stores nationwide. In subsequent years, her collections have been carried by Neiman Marcus, Saks Fifth Avenue, and specialty stores around the world.

In 2005, she launched her couture Bridal Gown collection. Appearing on the cover of Women's Wear Daily. In 2012, her "Sky Between the Branches" gown was worn by Priscilla Chan at her wedding to Facebook founder Mark Zuckerberg. The dress was bought at Little White Dress bridal boutique in Denver, Colorado. Shortly after the Chan-Zuckerberg wedding, UK pop sensation, Una Healy, from the girl group The Saturdays, donned the designer's, "Luna," gown from the Continuing Collection.

Her fashion includes couture bridal, fashion lingerie, and bridal accessories.

Retail

The Claire Pettibone Flagship Salon opened in 2001 in Beverly Hills. Pettibone began designing wedding and red carpet gowns for clients including Cameron Diaz, Courteney Cox Arquette, Leona Lewis, Elisabeth Moss, Katie Melua, Jennie Garth, Nikki Reed and Missi Pyle.

Her collections are stocked in wedding boutiques across the nation and internationally in Canada, Europe, Asia, and Oceania.

After 12 years at the Beverly Hills location, the "Claire Pettibone Flagship Salon" moved to a Los Angeles historic landmark called "The Castle," historically called the Heinsbergen Building on Beverly Boulevard on July 10, 2013.

Books
Contemporary Lingerie Design by Kate Dominy. Published by Laurence King.

References 

1970 births
Living people
People from Los Angeles
American fashion designers